Infrared cirrus or galactic cirrus are galactic filamentary structures seen in space over most of the sky that emit far-infrared light. The name is given because the structures are cloud-like in appearance. These structures were first detected by the Infrared Astronomy Satellite at wavelengths of 60 and 100 micrometres.

See also
 Cosmic infrared background

References

External links
 Molecular Hydrogen in Infrared Cirrus, Kristen Gillmon, J. Michael Shull, 2006 Abstract
 PDF Paper
 The Physics of Infrared Cirrus, C. Darren Dowell, Roger H. Hildebrand, Alexandre Lazarian, Michael W. Werner, Ellen Zweibel

Interstellar media